The Design Society is an international non-governmental, non-profit organisation with a focus on engineering design. The Design Society is a charitable body, registered in Scotland under the Office of the Scottish Charity Regulator, number SC 031694. The Design Society's flagship event is the biennial International Conference in Engineering Design (ICED).

History 
The Design Society was founded in 2000 building on the previous activities of the Workshop Design Konstruktion (WDK) group, especially the organisation of the ICED series of conferences held since 1981. The WDK group was an informally constituted international association based on a common interest in engineering design and founded in the early 1980s on the inspiration of Professors Vladimir Hubka, Mogens Myrup Andreasen, and Umberto Pighini.

The Design Society took over activities and responsibilities of WDK in 2001. The Design Society was constituted as a Charity under Scottish law and was incorporated as a Company Limited by Guarantee and Not Having a Share Capital under UK law (Companies Act, 2006).

Organization 
Membership in The Design Society is open to persons with recognised design qualifications and experience in the fields of design research, design practice, design management, and design education. The society is governed by a board of management. The board of management comprises five members of the society elected democratically by the society's members at general meetings, and officers include including the president, vice president and secretary.

The Design Society also has an advisory board that advises, guides and supports the board of management (BM) in developing and furthering the objectives of the society.  The advisory boards' members are elected democratically by the society's members at general meetings, which take place every two years during the ICED conferences.

The current serving officers (2017–2019) are Tim C. McAloone (president), Georges Fadel (vice-president and treasurer), Kristin Paetzold (secretary), Gaetano Cascini (BM member), Claudia Eckert, Panos Y. Papalambros (ex-officio BM member), and Alex Duffy (advisory board chair).

Conferences 
The Design Society host, co-own and endorse a number of events:

ICED: International Conference on Engineering Design 
ICED is the Biennial Flagship event owned and organised by The Design Society. Papers are published by the Design Society and indexed in Web of Science and Scopus. The conference attracts a wide background of attendees across academia, industry and governance with an interest in engineering design. Next ICED conference is in Bordeaux from 24th July to 28th July 2023, see https://iced.designsociety.org/.

E&PDE: Engineering and Product Design Education 
The Design Education Special Interest Group (DESIG) of the Design Society and the Institution of Engineering Designers (IED) and a host University collaborate on the organisation of the conference (University host listed in table below by year) co-owned by The Design Society. The conference is a forum to discuss current design educational issues and the nature of design education.

International Conference on Design Creativity (ICDC) 
Promoted by the Design Creativity Special Interest group of the Design Society to discuss latest findings in the nature and potential of design creativity. The event is co-owned by The Design Society. Selected papers of the ICDC Conference are published after extension and further review in the International Journal of Design Creativity and Innovation.

DESIGN: The International Design Conference 
Origanised by the University of Zagreb, with a Programme Committee from the Design Society, the DESIGN conference is a biennial conference that is endorsed by the Design Society. The objective of the DESIGN Conference series is to be integrative across the various design science disciplines, covering current state-of-the-art regarding the multidisciplinary aspects of design.

Design for X (DfX) Symposium 
Is an endorsed yearly event targeted at younger members with an interest in product development. Next DfX will take place in Dresden from 14th September to 15th September 2023, see https://symposium-dfx.de/.

Dependency and Structure Modeling (DSM) Conference 
Is an endorsed event which attracts those with an interest in DSM and tools to support.

International Conference on Research into Design (ICoRD) 
A biennial event in India this conference attracts a wide range of engineering design interests. This event is endorsed by The Design Society.

NordDesign Conference 
A bi-annual Nordic conference on engineering design endorsed by The Design Society.

Product Development Symposium (PDS) 
Product Development Symposium is an endorsed event of The Design Society aimed at an industry audience.

Journal 
The Design Society, in collaboration with Cambridge University Press, publishes the journal Design Science. The journal welcomes possible collaboration. The published articles are on the topics listed below and open access (published under a Creative Commons licence).

The topics addressed by the Design Society community are discussed in the following journals:

 Artificial Intelligence for Engineering Design, Analysis and Manufacturing (AI EDAM) – Published by Cambridge University Press
 CoDesign – International Journal of CoCreation in Design and the Arts – Published By Taylor & Francis Group 
 Journal of Design Research – Published by Inderscience Publishers 
 Journal of Engineering Design – Published by Taylor & Francis 
 Research in Engineering Design – Published by Springer Science & Business Media
 The International Journal of Design Creativity and Innovation – Published by Taylor and Francis

Topics 
The Design Society's members are actively engaged in a wide range of design topics, as reflected in its Special Interests Groups (SIGs) and its conference publications. These include the topics below (highlighted for ICED 2019 in Delft, Netherlands):

Design methodology 

 Researching of designs and design methods
 Design theories and approaches
 Theory-driven design
 Experiments in design

Design processes 

 Product development models and strategies
 Design process modelling and management
 Product innovation engineering
 Industrial design

Design management 

 Organisational understanding of product development
 Design of organizational processes
 Design of workspaces to manage product development
 Market and business implications
 Innovation strategies and innovation management
 Design practice: Best practice, industry practice (cases)

System design 

 Product and system modelling
 Product architectures, structural complexity
 Platform design, modularization, product family design
 Robust Design, Tolerance Management
 Design for Interfaces, Human-Machine Interfaces
 System of Systems Design

Service design 

 Product-service systems design
 Planning for service co-production
 Design services in innovation networks
 Design for service delivery
 Design tools and -techniques for service design

Design methods and tools 

 Design for X, design to X (quality, sustainability, costs, ...)
 Design tactics and methods
 Requirement management, user orientation, user integration
 Evaluation methods
 Modelling and simulation methods
 Usage and integration of supportive technologies
 Virtual Reality, Augmented Reality
 Digital Engineering
 Additive Manufacturing, 3D/4D Printing

Human behavior in design 

 Designers’ thinking and skills
 Teamwork in design
 Collaborative and participatory design
 Design communication
 Representation of design information
 Design for emotion and experience
 Decision Making
 Emotional Engineering

Design creativity 

 Creative design processes
 Cognitive processes in design creativity
 Supporting design creativity
 Assessing creativity

Design education and lifelong learning 

 Teaching examples and experiments
 Education experiences, plans, and visions
 Training in design (academic and industrial)
 Awareness of societal consequences

Design for healthcare 

 Design of medical devices
 Design for mental health and wellbeing
 Design for patient-centred care
 Designing e-health systems
 Design-driven innovations in healthcare
 User-centered design in healthcare

Design for sustainability 

 Design for a circular economy
 Design for product lifetime optimization
 Design for sustainable life/ consumption 
 Eco-design
 Design for the environment
 Design for cleaner production
 Environmental and sustainability assessment

Data-driven design 

 Data collection and knowledge management for big data
 Designing with sensory data
 Design statistics
 Big data mining
 Modelling consumer preferences/ behaviour
 Machine learning
 Semantic data processing
 Engineering ontologies

Next generation systems 

 Industry 4.0
 Designing of Cyber-Physical Systems
 Embedded Systems Design
 Design for the Internet of Everything
 Systems Engineering, Complex Systems Design
 Engineering of Robotics and Mechatronic Systems
 Design for Autonomous Agents
 Artificial Intelligence and Awareness
 Smart Engineering, Smart/self-adapting Systems
 Intelligent materials

Design and mobility 

 Design for E–mobility
 Lightweight design and efficiency
 Infrastructure and support system design

References

External links
The Design Society

Design institutions